Igor Schadilov (born June 7, 1980) is a Russian professional ice hockey defenceman who currently Free agent. He was selected by the Washington Capitals in the 9th round (249th overall) of the 1999 NHL Entry Draft.

References

External links

Living people
Ice hockey people from Moscow
1980 births
HC Dynamo Moscow players
Ak Bars Kazan players
Salavat Yulaev Ufa players
Severstal Cherepovets players
Krylya Sovetov Moscow players
Russian ice hockey defencemen
Washington Capitals draft picks